A Lonely Place to Die is a 2011 British action thriller film directed by Julian Gilbey and based on a screenplay from Julian and Will Gilbey. It stars Melissa George, Ed Speleers, Karel Roden, Eamonn Walker, Sean Harris and Kate Magowan.

Plot
Mountaineers Alison, Ed and Rob meet up with friends Jenny and Alex for a climbing and hiking trip in the Scottish Highlands. Whilst taking a break for lunch, they discover Anna, a young girl buried alive in a small chamber in the wilderness. They are unable to communicate with her as she speaks no English, with Ed guessing she might be Croatian. Deciding they need to get her to safety, Alison and Rob elect to take a shortcut to the nearest village to fetch help, but the route involves having to abseil down a high cliff named "Devils Drop". During their descent, Rob's rope apparently breaks, causing him to fall to his death. Alison is pelted with falling debris as she tumultuously reaches the bottom, whereupon she discovers Rob's rope was cut. Seeing a figure move away from the top of the cliff, it becomes clear the people who imprisoned Anna are trying to kill them.

After killing Rob and the unsuccessful attempt on Alison, Anna's kidnappers Mr. Kidd and Mr. Mcrae murder two nearby poachers and take their rifles, using them to open fire as Alison regroups with the others. During the attack Jenny is shot and killed, and Anna almost drowns after being pulled into river rapids, where she is eventually rescued by Alison. Alex distracts the two men by running in the opposite direction, holding a backpack wrapped in blankets that they mistake for Anna. Deciding to "follow the money", the two men give chase and gun him down, allowing Alison, Anna and Ed to escape the wilderness and reach the nearby town of Annan Mor. Meanwhile, Serbian mobster Darko, accompanied by British mercenaries Andy and Chris, travels to the area to negotiate a ransom exchange with Mr. Kidd and Mr. Mcrae on behalf of his employer.

Having been unable to recapture Anna, Mr. Kidd attempts to bluff his way through the negotiation with Darko, recalling a previous kidnapping when he murdered a young boy in Paris when his parents tried to avoid paying. Before Alison, Ed and Anna can be transported to Inverness by the police, they are tracked down by Mcrae, who kills the officers before pursuing them through the town, which is in the middle of hosting its Beltane festival. As the surviving mountaineers flee, Chris shoots Ed when he mistakes him for one of the kidnappers and is in turn shot by Mr. Mcrae, but manages to inform Darko that the kidnappers no longer have Anna before dying. After finishing off Ed, Mr. Mcrae chases Alison and Anna into a local house, which catches fire as he and Alison struggle. The fight eventually ends with Alison killing him by pushing him out of a window. She then manages to save Anna from the burning building before being rescued by firefighters. She is then transported to the hospital in an ambulance as Anna remains by her side.

Mr. Kidd nearly escapes with the ransom money, but is captured by Andy and brought before Mr. Rakovic, a Serbian war criminal who is Darko's boss and Anna's father. Rakovic has him tortured and buried alive in the woods for the kidnapping. Andy is paid the full fee for his services plus the car, with Rakovic remarking that he is in his debt.

Cast
Melissa George as Alison
Ed Speleers as Ed
Alec Newman as Rob
Kate Magowan as Jenny
Garry Sweeney as Alex
Holly Boyd as Anna Rakovic
Sean Harris as Mr. Kidd, one of Anna's kidnappers
Stephen McCole as Mr. Mcrae, another of Anna's kidnappers
Karel Roden as Darko, an associate of Mr. Rakovic
Eamonn Walker as Andy, a mercenary hired by Rakovic
Paul Anderson as Chris, another mercenary hired by Rakovic
Matthew Zajac as Mr. Rakovic, a Serbian war criminal and Anna's father

Production
Shooting began on 13 May 2010 in Scotland under the working title The Grave at Angel's Peak. Julian Gilbey shot the film from the screenplay "The Long Weekend" by Will Gilbey. The film is produced by Carnaby International, the studio behind Doghouse. Franka Potente was originally cast for the role as Alison and was later replaced by Melissa George.

The film was shot at various locations in Scotland, including Glen Coe, Glen Etive, Strathconon, Dingwall and Corrieshalloch Gorge.

In April 2011, the film had its world premiere at the ActionFest film festival in Asheville, North Carolina USA, where it was awarded 'Best Film' and 'Best Director'.

After the Cannes film market in May 2011, Kaleidoscope Entertainment picked up the UK rights to release the film.

The film had its UK premiere on 29 August 2011, where it was the closing film of Frightfest. It was released in UK cinemas shortly thereafter on 7 September. It was released in North America in November 2011, following a screening at the Toronto After Dark Film Festival on 24 October 2011.

Reception
On Rotten Tomatoes, the film has an approval rating of 75% based on 32 reviews, with an average rating of 5.9/10.

References

External links

Twitchfilm reviews A Lonely Place To Die

2011 films
2011 action thriller films
2011 horror films
2011 crime thriller films
2011 horror thriller films
British action thriller films
British crime thriller films
British horror thriller films
Films about child abduction
Films directed by Julian Gilbey
Films set in Scotland
Films shot in Scotland
Mountaineering films
Crime horror films
British survival films
2010s survival films
Films about the Serbian Mafia
2010s English-language films
2010s British films